Several incarnations of the Conowingo Bridge crossed the Susquehanna River at the original location of Conowingo, Maryland, United States, about two miles upstream of the Conowingo Dam, which replaced it.

History 

The original Conowingo Bridge was a seven-span, covered bridge built between 1818 and 1820 by Louis Wernwag, who also worked on the Rock Run Bridge.  (Another source lists 1844.)  That bridge was destroyed, in 1846 or 1847, by a flood.  A new wooden covered bridge opened in 1859.

This crossing was an important link between Maryland and northern states in the 19th century.  During the American Civil War it was guarded on its southern approach and some of the bridge decking removed to prevent surreptitious crossing.

On June 6, 1907, "firebugs" set fire to the 1859 bridge using kerosene.  About three-quarters of a mile of it burned.  The bridge was rebuilt as a steel structure in 1909.  In 1911 the state of Maryland bought the bridge and ended the tolls.

With the completion of the dam in 1928 both the town and the crossing were relocated due to the rising waters impounded by the dam.  The road crossing moved to the top of the dam.  The bridge was then destroyed by blasting gelatin.

References

External links 

Old Conowingo Covered Bridge circa 1880
Photo of the bridge, Maryland Historical Society
Bridge photos, including demolition
More of the 1900 Topographical Map showing the Conowingo Bridge

Bridges over the Susquehanna River
Bridges completed in 1820
Bridges completed in 1859
Bridges completed in 1909
Road bridges in Maryland
Covered bridges in the United States destroyed by arson
Arson in Maryland
Former toll bridges in Maryland
Steel bridges in the United States
Wooden bridges in Maryland
Bridges in Cecil County, Maryland
U.S. Route 1